Sima Violet was a French manufacturer of cyclecars between 1924 and 1929.

The name 
Sima was an acronym, the letters standing for "Société Industrielle de Matériel Automobile".   Violet respected the creator of the cars, Marcel Violet.

The business 
The company was founded at Courbevoie on the northwestern side of Paris, in a part of the city which was already home to numerous automobile manufacturers and  suppliers.   Marcel Violet who created the little vehicle was a long-standing advocate of two-stroke air-cooled boxer-format engines, and these powered the cyclecars that carried his name   Sima Violet ended production in 1929, to be succeeded at their Courbevoie site by the Sima-Standard business which survived till 1932.

The cars 
The only vehicle produced was a cyclecar, which was a four-wheeled vehicle lighter than a conventional passenger car, but with a two-stroke engine and light-weight construction reminiscent of a motor cycle.   In the years following the First World War the French government used taxation policy to encourage cyclecars.

The Sima-Violet cyclecar was powered by a two-stroke twin-cylinder air-cooled engine of 497cc mounted in a low-slung position ahead of the driver.   Power was delivered to the rear wheels via a two speed transmission mounted on the rear-axle.  The quoted top speed for a standard vehicle was 110 km/h (68 mph).   The Sima-Violet appeared at the Paris Motor Show in October 1924 at which time the only body-style listed was  a steel-frame "Torpedo" type 2-seater, sitting on a  wheelbase, and which the manufacturer was listing at a price of 4,950 francs.   A single seater sports bodied version was also produced.

The front wheels were suspended using a transversely mounted leaf-spring, combined with "friction shock-absorbers".   The brakes operated only on the rear wheels.

By the time of its final show appearance at the 22nd Paris Motor Show in October 1928 the car had acquired what appears to be a vertically mounted radiator at the front, but was still reportedly powered by a flat-twin motor-cycle style engine.

Reading list 
 Harald Linz, Halwart Schrader: Die Internationale Automobil-Enzyklopädie. United Soft Media Verlag, München 2008, . (German)
 George Nick Georgano (Chefredakteur): The Beaulieu Encyclopedia of the Automobile. Volume 3: P–Z. Fitzroy Dearborn Publishers, Chicago 2001, . (English)
 George Nick Georgano: Autos. Encyclopédie complète. 1885 à nos jours. Courtille, Paris 1975. (French)

External links 

 Internetseite über Suère (English and Dutch) retrieved, 21 February 2013)

Sources and notes 

Defunct motor vehicle manufacturers of France
Vehicle manufacturing companies established in 1924
Cyclecars
Vehicle manufacturing companies disestablished in 1929
French companies established in 1924
1929 disestablishments in France